The Princeton Tigers will represent Princeton University in the 2009–10 NCAA Division I women's ice hockey season. The Tigers will be coached by Jeff Kampersal. Assisting Kampersal are Amy Bourbeau, Francois Bourbeau and Jessica Link.

Offseason
May 21: Princeton women's hockey coach Jeff Kampersal has announced the team's incoming class that will join the Tigers for the 2009–10 season. The group of five players includes three Americans and two Canadians, and will join a Tiger team that was 18–11–2 last season and finished third in the ECAC Hockey standings. The members of the class of 2013 are:
8 - Krystyna Bellisario
Defenseman • 5-8 • Shoots Left
Woodbridge, Ont. • Toronto Junior Aeros
2 - Kelly Cooke
Forward • 5-1 • Shoots Left
Andover, Mass. • Noble and Greenough School
12 - Alex Kinney
Forward • 5-9 • Shoots Right
Lake Forest, Ill. • The Hotchkiss School
23 - Cassie Seguin
Goaltender • 5-10 • Catches Left
Ingleside, Ont. • NCCP/Ottawa Senators
Corey Stearns
Forward • 5-10 • Shoots Right
Falmouth, Mass. • Noble and Greenough School
July 11: Sasha Sherry is one of 41 players selected to participate in the 2009 USA Hockey Women's National Festival, which will take place August 18–24 in Blaine, Minn. The Festival will serve as the selection camp for the 2009–10 U.S. Women's National Team that will compete in the Qwest Tour, a 10-game domestic tour that begins Sept. 25 and ends just prior to the start of the 2010 Olympic Winter Games in Vancouver, B.C.

Scrimmages

Regular season

Standings

Roster

Schedule

Player stats

Goaltenders

Postseason

NCAA Hockey tournament

Awards and honors
Sasha Sherry, Pre-Season All-ECAC Team
Carrie Seguin, ECAC Defensive Player of the Week (Week of November 9)
Carrie Seguin, ECAC Rookie of the Week (Week of November 9)

Ivy League honors
 Danielle DiCesare, Forward, Sophomore, 2010 Honorable Mention
 Paula Romanchuk, Forward, Sophomore, 2010 Honorable Mention
 Sasha Sherry, Defense, Junior, 2010 Second Team All-Ivy

See also
2009–10 College Hockey America women's ice hockey season
2009–10 Eastern College Athletic Conference women's ice hockey season

References

External links
Official site

Princeton
Princeton Tigers women's ice hockey seasons
Princeton Tigers
Princeton Tigers